The 2016 season was the Baltimore Ravens' 21st in the National Football League (NFL) and their ninth under head coach John Harbaugh. With a week 12 win over the Cincinnati Bengals, the Ravens improved upon their 5–11 record from 2015, finishing the season 8–8. Despite the improvement, the Ravens failed to qualify for the playoffs for the second consecutive year after losing to the Pittsburgh Steelers on Christmas Day in Week 16. It was the first time the Ravens missed the playoffs in consecutive seasons since 2004–2005, and their first consecutive non-winning seasons since 1996–1999. They did, however, improve their position in the division, finishing in second place after finishing in third place for the previous three seasons.

Draft

Notes
 The Ravens traded their fifth-round selection and center Gino Gradkowski to the Denver Broncos in exchange for the Broncos' fourth-round selection. However, Gradkowski was released by the Broncos prior to the  season.
 The Ravens traded their seventh-round selection to the Miami Dolphins in exchange for cornerback Will Davis.
 The Ravens received two fourth-round and a sixth-round compensatory pick (Nos. 132, 134, and 209 respectively) as the result of a negative differential of free agent signings and departures that the Ravens experienced during the  free agency period.

Staff

Final roster

Preseason

Regular season

Schedule

Note: Intra-division opponents are in bold text.

Game summaries

Week 1: Baltimore Ravens 13, Buffalo Bills 7

The Ravens started the season with the return of their injured starters from last season. While the offense played a fairly average game, the defense was dominant, holding former teammate Tyrod Taylor and the Bills offense to only 160 total yards. The team looked overall much better than last season, with no major injuries and few penalties (6 for 35 yards).

Week 2: Baltimore Ravens 25, Cleveland Browns 20

The Ravens traveled to their division rival Cleveland Browns for their road opener. After Browns' starting quarterback Robert Griffin III was injured in week 1, the Ravens faced Josh McCown who passed for 457 yards against them last season. After a dismal start in which the defense allowed 20 points in the first quarter, they bounced back with a blocked extra point for a safety, after which Joe Flacco and the offense finally returned with full strength, with two touchdown passes to Mike Wallace and three Justin Tucker field goals, shutting out the Browns 25–0 in the final three-quarters.

Week 3: Baltimore Ravens 19, Jacksonville Jaguars 17

With the win, the Ravens improved to 3-0 and sat on top of the division with the Steelers' loss to the Eagles.

Week 4: Oakland Raiders 28, Baltimore Ravens 27

The Ravens stayed at home for a matchup against the Raiders who never won at Baltimore. Unfortunately the Ravens could not hold on to the lead after Derek Carr found Michael Crabtree in the end zone near the end of the game. Baltimore began driving down the field but the drive stalled allowing the Raiders to win at Baltimore for the first time in history dropping the Ravens 3–1. With the Steelers win, the Ravens dropped to second place in the AFC North

Week 5: Washington Redskins 16, Baltimore Ravens 10

After a dismal loss to the Redskins in which Joe Flacco and the offense were completely shut out in the second half, the Ravens Fired Offensive Coordinator Marc Trestman. It was their first home loss to an NFC East team since 1997, when the Arizona Cardinals won at Memorial Stadium five years before moving to the NFC West.

Week 6: New York Giants 27, Baltimore Ravens 23

Trying to halt a two-game losing streak, the Ravens traveled to MetLife for one of their two straight games there. The Ravens had a chance to win the game by driving down the field in the final seconds, but the Giants defense held the Ravens back as Flacco threw an incompletion on the final play, dropping the Ravens to 3–3 and their second three-game losing streak in a year. The Ravens defense allowed Beckham two 60+ yard touchdowns, helping the Giants win.

Week 7: New York Jets 24, Baltimore Ravens 16

Trying to not fall to a four-game losing streak, the Ravens visited the New York Jets, who were also struggling. The Ravens offense did not get any better only managed a franchise record of six yards rushing in the entire game. The ineffective running game coupled with poor play from quarterback Joe Flacco resulted in the team's fourth straight loss as the team entered their bye week at 3–4. The Ravens had a chance to tie the game but were stopped allowing the Jets to win.

Week 9: Baltimore Ravens 21, Pittsburgh Steelers 14

The win put the Ravens in first place in the AFC North.

Week 10: Baltimore Ravens 28, Cleveland Browns 7

After a Joe Flacco interception which led to the Browns 7–6 at halftime, the Ravens dominated the rest of the game scoring 22-0 the rest of the game and leaving the Ravens sole first place of the division.

Week 11: Dallas Cowboys 27, Baltimore Ravens 17

Week 12: Baltimore Ravens 19, Cincinnati Bengals 14

Week 13: Baltimore Ravens 38, Miami Dolphins 6

With the commanding win, the Ravens improved to 7–5.

Week 14: New England Patriots 30, Baltimore Ravens 23

With the loss, the Ravens fell to 7–6 and 1–8 all time against the Patriots in the regular season.

Week 15: Baltimore Ravens 27, Philadelphia Eagles 26

With their playoff hopes on the line, the Ravens were dealt a heavy hand against a struggling Eagles team. After giving up two scoring drives in the final six minutes, the Ravens escaped defeat when the Eagles went for two for the win and failed.

Week 16: Pittsburgh Steelers 31, Baltimore Ravens 27
'''NFL on Christmas Day

Not only did the Ravens drop to 8–7, but their four-game winning streak over the Steelers was snapped and they were eliminated from the playoff contention for the second consecutive year.

Week 17: Cincinnati Bengals 27, Baltimore Ravens 10

This would be Steve Smith's Sr.'s final game in the NFL. He finished the game with three catches for 34 yards. After the game, he immediately retired, ending his 16-year career.

With the loss, the Ravens ended their season at 8-8.

Standings

Division

Conference

References

External links

 

Baltimore
Baltimore Ravens seasons
Baltimore Ravens
2010s in Baltimore